Shahid Dastgheib Hospital is a public hospital located in Shiraz, Iran and currently has a capacity of 130 beds.

References

External links 
Location of Shahid Dastgheib Hospital

hospitals in Iran